Ozyornoye is a rural locality (a selo) in Semyonovsky Selsoviet, Kulundinsky District, Altai Krai, Russia. The population was 12 as of 2013. There is 1 street.

Geography 
Ozyornoye is located 32 km southeast of Kulunda (the district's administrative centre) by road. Semyonovka is the nearest rural locality.

References 

Rural localities in Kulundinsky District